Wael Ghassan Saeed (born January 1, 1984) is a Qatari swimmer. He competed at the 2000 Summer Olympics.

External links
Wael Ghassan Saeed

Living people
Swimmers at the 2000 Summer Olympics
Olympic swimmers of Qatar
Qatari male swimmers
Swimmers at the 2002 Asian Games
1984 births
Asian Games competitors for Qatar
Place of birth missing (living people)